Woodland is a village in Barry County of the U.S. state of Michigan.  The population was 425 at the 2010 census. The village is located within Woodland Township.

Geography

Woodland is located in the northeastern corner of Barry County. This is a small agricultural town that is also a bedroom community to the Lansing and Grand Rapids areas. It also has its own village form of government and elementary school.

Woodland was first settled in 1837 when Charles & Jonathon Galloway and Charles Haight moved here. It and the township were named after the dense forests in the area. The Chicago, Kalamazoo and Saginaw Railway came through here in 1889 which promoted its growth. It was incorporated as a village in 1892.

Demographics

2010 census
As of the census of 2010, there were 425 people, 162 households, and 116 families living in the village. The racial makeup of the village was 96.9% White, 0.2% African American, 0.2% Asian, 1.9% from other races, and 0.7% from two or more races. Hispanic or Latino of any race were 3.8% of the population.

There were 162 households, of which 38.3% had children under the age of 18 living with them, 49.4% were married couples living together, 16.0% had a female householder with no husband present, 6.2% had a male householder with no wife present, and 28.4% were non-families. 25.3% of all households were made up of individuals, and 9.9% had someone living alone who was 65 years of age or older. The average household size was 2.62 and the average family size was 3.03.

The median age in the village was 35.5 years. 27.1% of residents were under the age of 18; 9.8% were between the ages of 18 and 24; 27.6% were from 25 to 44; 22.9% were from 45 to 64; and 12.7% were 65 years of age or older. The gender makeup of the village was 51.1% male and 48.9% female.

2000 census
As of the census of 2000, there were 495 people, 180 households, and 133 families living in the village. The racial makeup of the village was 98.38% White, 0.20% African American, 0.20% Native American, 0.20% Asian, 0.20% from other races, and 0.81% from two or more races. Hispanic or Latino of any race were 2.83% of the population.

There were 180 households, out of which 41.7% had children under the age of 18 living with them, 60.0% were married couples living together, 11.1% had a female householder with no husband present, and 25.6% were non-families. 22.2% of all households were made up of individuals, and 10.6% had someone living alone who was 65 years of age or older.  The average household size was 2.75 and the average family size was 3.24.

In the village, the population was spread out, with 32.5% under the age of 18, 7.1% from 18 to 24, 32.3% from 25 to 44, 18.2% from 45 to 64, and 9.9% who were 65 years of age or older.  The median age was 30 years. For every 100 females, there were 108.9 males.  For every 100 females age 18 and over, there were 106.2 males.

The median income for a household in the village was $32,222, and the median income for a family was $48,942. Males had a median income of $33,438 versus $23,333 for females. The per capita income for the village was $14,908.  About 13.8% of families and 15.4% of the population were below the poverty line, including 20.7% of those under age 18 and 2.0% of those age 65 or over.

External links
 Barry County Michigan Postcard Collection

References

Villages in Barry County, Michigan
Villages in Michigan
Grand Rapids metropolitan area